Kabaağaç is a village in the Sarayköy District of Denizli Province in Turkey.

References

Villages in Sarayköy District